Vasili Yevgenyevich Azarov (born 19 August 1992) is a Russian former football player.

Club career
He made his debut in the Russian Football National League for FC Yenisey Krasnoyarsk on 12 March 2016 in a game against FC Baikal Irkutsk.

References

External links
 Profile by Russian Football National League

1992 births
Living people
Russian footballers
Association football goalkeepers
FC Yenisey Krasnoyarsk players
FC Oryol players